The Bladder pipe (German: Platerspiel or Blaterpfeife) is a medieval simplified bagpipe, consisting of an insufflation tube (blow pipe), a bladder (bag) and a chanter; sounded by a double reed, which is fitted into a reed seat at the top of the chanter.  The reed, inside the inflated bladder, is sounded continuously, and cannot be tongued. Some bladder pipes were made with a single drone pipe, and reproductions are similar to a loud, continuous crumhorn. The chanter has an outside tenon, at the top, near the reed, which fits into a socket or stock, which is then tied into the bladder.

History
While the first creation of a double reed pipe with a bladder controlling breath is unknown, it is believed to have originated in Europe before the 13th century. As an intermediate phase between the almost pan-European bagpipe and the Renaissance crumhorn, the Bladder pipe flourished from the 14th to 16th centuries.

Examples have been found from Germany, Poland, England, France, Italy, Spain (called the odrecillo) and Estonia (called the rakkopilli). As it declined in popularity, it became associated with beggars and peasants.

The early bladder pipe is in a family of the early medieval "chorus" instruments, a word which in medieval Latin was frequently used also for the bagpipe. In the earliest illustrated forms of bladder pipe, such as the well-known example of the 13th century reproduced by Martin Gerbert from a manuscript at Sankt Blasien Abbey in the Black Forest, the bladder is unusually large, and the chanter (or melody pipe) has, instead of a bell, the carved head of an animal. At first the chanter was a straight conical tube terminating in a bell, as in the bagpipe. The later instruments have a pipe of larger calibre more or less curved and bent back as in the letter "J" as the crumhorn, tournebout, and cromorne. This curvature, coming from the shape of an animal horn, suggests the early crumhorn's development from a bladder pipe.  One famous illustration of these bladder pipes appears in the 13th-century Spanish manuscript, known as the Cantigas de Santa Maria in the library of El Escorial in Madrid, together with a bladder pipe having two pipes, a chanter and a drone side by side. Another Platerspiel David is illustrated by Sebastian Virdung (1511).

Other forms
There was practically no technical difference between the bent chanter of the bladder pipe and the cromorne, the only distinction being the form and size of the air-chamber, either the bladder or the wind-cap, in which the reed was set in vibration. The player blows air into the bladder through the insufflation tube, or through the raised, slit-shaped opening of the wind cap, placed against the player's lips. This earlier Italian form of bladder pipe is found illustrated at the end of the 15th century in the Book of Hours, known as the Sforza Book.

In literature
An allusion to the bladder pipe occurs in an old English ballad:

Eight shepherds were playing on various instruments: "The fyrst hed ane drone bagpipe, the next hed ane pipe maid of ane bleddir and of ane reid, the third playit on ane trump."

This excerpt suggests the early English bladder pipe retained a distinct form, and did not become merged with the bagpipe.

See also
Pig bladder
Bladder fiddle

Notes

References
German Wikipedia's Platerspiel, including  image.
Musica Antiqua Instruments: The Bladder Pipe. Iowa State University, Retrieved January 2008

Attribution

Print bibliography
Anthony Baines.  Woodwind Instruments and Their History. W. W. Norton, New York (1957)
Howard Mayer Brown. Instruments of the Middle Ages and Renaissance: In Memoriam David Munrow. Early Music, Vol. 4, No. 3 (Jul., 1976), pp. 288–289+291+293
Roger Pinon.  Philologie et Folklore Musical. Les Instruments de Musique des Patres au Moyen Age et a la Renaissance. Jahrbuch für Volksliedforschung, 14. Jahrg., 1969 (1969), pp. 85–101
Zoltan Falvy.  Musical Instruments in the Kaufmann Manuscripts, Budapest.  Studia Musicologica Academiae Scientiarum Hungaricae, T. 37, Fasc. 2/4 (1996), pp. 231–248
Inglis Gundry.  Medieval Church Drama: Some Practical Considerations. The Musical Times, Vol. 104, No. 1441 (Mar., 1963), pp. 183–184
Rainer Weber. Tournebout - Pifia - Bladderpipe (Platerspiel), The Galpin Society Journal, Vol. 30, May, 1977 (May, 1977), pp. 64–69
 G Kinsky: 'Doppelrolrblatt-Instrumente mit Windkapsel', AMw vii (1925), 253-96
 H. Becker: Zur Entwicklungsgeschichter der antiken und mittelalterlichen Rohrblattinstrumente (Hamburg, 1966)

External links
Sound recording online, by Antiqua
Weytora music ensemble, Poland: Platerspiel: image showing a bladder pipe with a drone Retrieved January 2008
image on gajdy.cz, Czech folklore site: Platerspiel: image showing a bladder pipe with a drone Retrieved January 2008
karmina.cz, Music ensemble Platerspiel: image showing a bladder pipe with a drone Retrieved January 2008
Platerspiel: image showing a bladder pipe with a drone Retrieved January 2008
medievaltravel.co.uk :Medieval Music, Bladder Pipe
Pavel Cip & synove : Czech instrument craftsmen who make reproduction Bladder-pipes with and without drones.  Includes specs and images

Bagpipes
Early musical instruments
Czech musical instruments
Medieval musical instruments